Ayako Miyazaki (born 9 March 1982) is a former Japanese cricketer who played four Women's One Day International cricket matches for Japan national women's cricket team in 2003.

References

1982 births
Living people
Japanese women cricketers